Elizabeth Burke may refer to:

 Elizabeth Burke, a character in the television series White Collar
 Elizabeth Burke, a character in The Faculty
Elizabeth Burke-Plunkett, née Elizabeth Burke (1862–1944), an Irish activist
Betty Burke, alias of Bonnie Prince Charlie